Paddy frog may refer to:

 Green paddy frog (Hylarana erythraea), a frog in the family Ranidae found in Southeast Asia
 Hong Kong paddy frog (Fejervarya multistriata), a frog in the family Dicroglossidae found in China and Taiwan and possibly Vietnam, Laos, Thailand, and Myanmar
 Stejneger's paddy frog (Micryletta steinegeri), a frog in the family Microhylidae endemic to Taiwan

Animal common name disambiguation pages